Live Acoustic EP is the fourth EP by American experimental rock band VersaEmerge. It was released in August 2011 to tide over fans until the release of their second album, Another Atmosphere.

Track list

Personnel
 VersaEmerge
 Sierra Kusterbeck - Vocals
 Blake Harnage - Guitar

References

Versa (band) EPs
2011 EPs